Macliver is a surname. Notable people with the surname include:

Peter Stewart Macliver (1822–1891), Scottish journalist and politician
Sara Macliver, Australian opera singer